The Driggs River is a  tributary of the Manistique River on the Upper Peninsula of Michigan in the United States. It flows for its entire length in Schoolcraft County.

See also
List of rivers of Michigan

References

Michigan  Streamflow Data from the USGS

Rivers of Michigan
Rivers of Schoolcraft County, Michigan
Tributaries of Lake Michigan